Chief marshal of the armored troops Pavel Alexeyevich Rotmistrov (6 July 1901 in Skovorovo – 6 April 1982) was a Soviet military commander of armoured troops in the Red Army during and following World War II. he fought from the first days and was present in every major Soviet battle including Battle of Moscow, Battle of Stalingrad and for leading the 5th Guards Tank Army at the Battle of Prokhorovka at the Battle of Kursk. Rotmistrov became the first Marshal of the Soviet armoured troops .

Pre-War
Rotmistrov joined the Red Army in 1919, and served during the Russian Civil War, during which he was involved in the suppression of the Kronstadt Rebellion and in the Polish Soviet War.  He commanded a platoon and later rifle company in 31st Rifle Regiment of 11th Rifle Division.  In 1928 he entered Frunze Military Academy. From 1937 to 1940 he was an instructor at the Moscow Higher Military Academy. In May 1941 he became Chief of Staff of the 3rd Mechanised Corps.

Second World War
Rotmistrov commanded his first tank battalion during the Soviet-Finish war. He started the war against Germany with the 3rd Mechanised Corps, which was destroyed during Operation Barbarossa. He then commanded 8th tank brigade which was transferred to Kalinin front during the Battle of Moscow. After several successful battles in the summer of 1942 he was sent to Stalingrad to be part of the 1st Guards Army. He commanded 5th Guards Tank Army in the Battle of Prokhorovka during the Battle of Kursk, and in Operation Bagration. The unit under his command, the 5th Guards Tank Army engaged in a brutal tank battle near Prokhorovka against the attacking Waffen SS divisions Leibstandarte SS Adolf Hitler, Das Reich and Totenkopf almost in a point-blank range of 100–200 meters. As the German advance was noticed, spearheaded by the three most elite Waffen SS divisions towards Prokhorovka advancing in force, Rotmistrov ordered direct counter-attack from the army that was prepared to go by radioing "Steel, Steel, Steel" against the Germans to get close to them as possible to make up for the better guns the German tanks had. In the ensuing battle, a close-quarter open field tank battle ensued so that most shots from both sides were a direct hit. The distance between the forces was such that tanks were shooting each other from left and right one after another and close enough to ram the German tanks to disable their relatively powerful guns from turning.

As the battle ended, significant losses were reported from the 5th Guards Tank Army. He was removed from command following Bagration and became deputy head of armored troops at the General Staff. The manner in which he conducted the battle including the heavy losses the 5th Guards Tank Army took was not unnoticed by Joseph Stalin that he planned to have Rotimstrov court-martialed and sacked for the heavy losses. This did not occur since Aleksandr Vasilevsky interceded. It is possible that the high losses incurred by the 5th Guards Tank Army at the Battle of Minsk led to his removal from command. It is notable that he never held an active unit command again.
He was promoted to colonel-general in October 1943 and became the first Marshal of Armoured Troops in February 1944.

Post-War
Following the war he commanded the mechanized forces of the Group of Soviet Forces in Germany, and he became an assistant minister of defense.
He became the first Chief Marshal of Armoured Troops on 28 April 1962.

Awards and decorations
Soviet Union

Foreign

References

External links
 Biography on Generals.dk
 Biography

1901 births
1982 deaths
Soviet Marshals of Tank Troops
People from Selizharovsky District
Heroes of the Soviet Union
Soviet military personnel of World War II
Recipients of the Order of Lenin
Recipients of the Order of the Red Banner
Recipients of the Order of Suvorov, 1st class
Recipients of the Order of Kutuzov, 1st class
Recipients of the Order of Suvorov, 2nd class
Frunze Military Academy alumni
Burials at Novodevichy Cemetery
Recipients of the Order of the Red Star
Recipients of the Silver Cross of the Virtuti Militari
Recipients of the Order "For Service to the Homeland in the Armed Forces of the USSR", 3rd class